Rikshavodu is a 1995 Telugu language film starring Chiranjeevi, Nagma and Soundarya, directed by Kodi Ramakrishna and produced by Kranthi Kumar. Chiranjeevi played a dual role in the film. It was dubbed in Hindi as Devaa The Power Man and in Tamil as Veeraputhran.

Plot
Chiranjeevi has enacted a dual role in this film. The film opens with a scene where Chiranjeevi come to the city in search of a livelihood with his grandmother Manorama. He is befriended by Brahmanandam and taken to Soundarya, who rents rickshaws. One day while driving passengers in his rickshaw, he has a confrontation with Nagma, who hit it by driving her car aggressively. He files a suit against her in the court, but fails due to the influence of Nagma's wealthy father Paresh Rawal. After some scenes, Paresh Rawal forces his daughter to marry Chiranjeevi to build up his political career as Chiru has a good mass following in his area. Manorama sees Paresh and then reveals his past. His father (also Chiranjeevi) a good human being and also a village head. Envied by the good name he has in the village, Paresh Rawal traps his sister and sees that she commits suicide and also blames his wife Jayasudha that she is illicit. He kills Chiranjeevi in a village fight and that blame is taken by Jayasudha and she is in jail and all the villagers think that she is the actual cause of all this. Now the son takes revenge on the villain and opens the truth before the villagers. Also Nagma transforms into his loving wife after knowing her fathers' deeds.

Cast
 Chiranjeevi as Raju & Dharma Rayudu (dual role)
 Nagma as Rani
 Soundarya as Narsakka
 Jayasudha as Raju's Mother
 Manorama as Bamma
 Brahmanandam as Ramakrishna, Raju's Rickshaw Friend
 Paresh Rawal as G. K. Rao
 A.V.S as G. K. Rao's Assistant
 Gundu Hanumantha Rao
 Subbaraya Sharma

Music
Music scored by Raj-Koti; Lyrics penned by Veturi Sundararama Murthy and Bhuvana Chandra.

Release
Rikshavodu clashed with Dasari Narayana Rao and R. Narayana Murthy's major production Orey Rikshaw that released in December 1995. While both Orey Rikshaw and Rikshavodu featured a rickshaw puller as its protagonist, only Orey Rikshaw emerged successful at the box office.

References

External links
 

1995 films
1990s Telugu-language films
Films directed by Kodi Ramakrishna
Films scored by Raj–Koti
1990s masala films
Indian action films
Indian films about revenge
Films scored by Koti
1995 action films